Eremias velox (commonly known as the rapid racerunner, Central Asian racerunner, or rapid fringe-toed lizard) is a species of lizard found in Kazakhstan, Turkmenistan, Tajikistan, Uzbekistan, Kyrgyzstan, Iran, Afghanistan, China, Russia, Azerbaijan, and Georgia. Eremias vermiculata is also sometimes known as the Central Asian racerunner.

References

Eremias
Reptiles described in 1771
Taxa named by Peter Simon Pallas
Reptiles of Russia